Valli O'Reilly is a make-up artist.

She won at the 77th Academy Awards for her work on the film Lemony Snicket's A Series of Unfortunate Events in the category of Best Makeup. She shared her win with Bill Corso.

In addition to her Oscar, she won a BAFTA award for the film Alice in Wonderland.

Valli also worked on Ant-Man and the Wasp (2018) and Avengers: Endgame (2019) as a makeup artist for Michelle Pfeiffer.

Filmography

References

External links

Living people
American make-up artists
Best Makeup Academy Award winners
Best Makeup BAFTA Award winners
Canadian Screen Award winners
Place of birth missing (living people)
Year of birth missing (living people)